Child of Darkness, Child of Light is a 1991 American television horror film directed by Marina Sargenti, and starring Tony Denison, Brad Davis, and Claudette Nevins. It is based on the 1980 novel Virgin by James Patterson. The film follows a Catholic priest who goes to investigate two reported cases of virgin birth; one of God, and the other of the devil. The film was shot in Portland, Oregon, and premiered on May 1, 1991.

Plot
Father Rosetti is sent by the Vatican to a small city in Pennsylvania to investigate a report of an impending virgin birth, but he is attacked on the road by mysterious bikers, making him crash and leaving him catatonic. In his place, Vatican sends Father Justin O'Carroll, not without warning him that seventy years before, the Virgin Mary appeared in an Italian village and left a message concerning the birth of a divine child at the end of the century.

After arriving in the city, O'Carroll meets a pregnant 15-year-old teen, Margaret Gallagher, who is bullied by her classmates for her claims of being a virgin. Margaret also has painful visions of people dying, and when a bully attempts to harass her, he suffers mysterious wounds. O'Carroll also finds out that an epidemic of Polio is ravaging the country. When he returns to the Vatican, he learns that another girl claiming a virgin pregnancy, Kathleen Beavier, has surfaced in Boston, being possibly the target of a second part of the prophecy, which talks about a child of Satan. O'Carroll finds that Kathleen's recent life mirrors exactly that of Margaret, and he is forced to investigate which girl will be the mother of which child.

Cast

References

External links
 

1991 horror films
1991 television films
1991 films
American horror television films
Films based on American horror novels
Films shot in Portland, Oregon
Religious horror films
1990s American films